Václav Haman (born 18 July 1986) is a Czech sports shooter and professional gunsmith. He competed at the 2008 and 2012 Summer Olympics.

References

External links
 
 

1986 births
Living people
Czech male sport shooters
Olympic shooters of the Czech Republic
Shooters at the 2008 Summer Olympics
Shooters at the 2012 Summer Olympics
People from Jičín
Gunsmiths
Sportspeople from the Hradec Králové Region